

See also 
 GraphHopper
 Navteq
 Petal Maps
 Online virtual globes
 Tencent Maps
 Traffic Message Channel (TMC)

References

External links 
 Google Maps
 Bing Maps
 MapQuest Maps
 Mapy.cz
 OpenStreetMap
 Here
 Apple Maps
 Yandex.Maps

Web mapping
Street view services
Transportation geography
Web mapping